General elections were held in Japan on 27 February 1955. The result was a victory for the Japan Democratic Party, which won 185 of the 467 seats. Voter turnout was 76%.

On 15 November 1955, the Japan Democratic Party and the Liberal Party combined as the modern Liberal Democratic Party, which ruled Japan continuously until 1993. The Rightist Socialist Party of Japan and the Leftist Socialist Party of Japan also merged to form the Japan Socialist Party, which was Japan's largest opposition party in the 1955 system.

Results

By prefecture

References

Japan
1955 elections in Japan
General elections in Japan
February 1955 events in Asia
Election and referendum articles with incomplete results